Gotthard Arthus or Gotardus Artusius Dantiscanus (1568–1628) was a schoolmaster, historian and translator in early seventeenth-century Frankfurt.

Life
Gotthard Arthus was born in Danzig on 11 January 1568. In 1589 he matriculated at the University of Jena, graduating Master of Arts in 1592. Four years later a Johann Arthus matriculated who may have been a relation. In 1595 he was appointed to the city school in Frankfurt on Main, becoming deputy head in 1618.

He died in Frankfurt on 15 February 1628.

Among his publications is a continuation of Michael ab Isselt's Mercurius Gallobelgicus, for the years 1603-1626, printed in Frankfurt and distinct from the Cologne continuation. He was also a translator from Dutch.

Works
 Historia Indiae orientalis (Frankfurt, 1600)
 Historia chronologica Pannoniae (Frankfurt, 1608)
 Cometa orientalis: kurtze Beschreibung desz newen Cometen (Frankfurt, 1619; available on Gallica.fr) – a discussion of the Great Comet of 1618.
 Commentariorum de rebus in Regno Antichristi memorabilibus (3 vols., Frankfurt, 1620)
 Sleidanus redivivus (Frankfurt, 1618) – a continuation of Johannes Sleidanus, Commentariorum de statu religionis et reipublicae
 Mercurius Gallobelgicus succenturiati (Frankfurt, 1603-1626)

References

1568 births
1628 deaths
Writers from Gdańsk
Writers from Frankfurt
17th-century German educators
17th-century Latin-language writers
German schoolteachers
University of Jena alumni